Deena Herr, who performs under the stage name Deena, is a German singer performing in Uganda.

A social worker in training from Berlin, Deena was discovered in 2013 by an Ugandan music producer while traveling in Kampala. Her single Mumulete! ("Bring him to me!"), written in the local language Luganda and released in 2015, was a viral hit in Uganda, leading to a career in Ugandan television and radio. Deena has attributed part of her success to the novelty of being a white woman performing in a local language, which the public much appreciates.

References

21st-century Ugandan women singers
Living people
21st-century German women singers
Year of birth missing (living people)
Place of birth missing (living people)